Nannie is a given name. Notable people with the name include:

 Nannie Helen Burroughs, (1879–1961), African-American educator, orator, religious leader and businesswoman
 Nannie Webb Curtis (1861–1920), American lecturer, temperance activist, clubwoman
 Nannie de Villiers (born 1976), South African former tennis player
 Nannie Doss (1905–1965), American serial killer
 Nannie Lambert Power O'Donoghue (1843–1940), Irish author, poet and journalist
 Nannie Kelly Wright (1856–1946), born Nannie Scott Honshell, the only known American female ironmaster
 Nannie Brown, nickname of Agnes Brown (suffragist)
 Nannie, a witch in Robert Burn's poem "Tam o' Shanter"

See also
Nannie Helen Burroughs School, a private coeducational elementary school in the District of Columbia
Nannie Lee House (a.k.a. Strawberry Mansion), a historic U.S. home in Melbourne, Florida
 Alternative spelling of Nanny